Midtre Folgefonna is a glacier located in the Hardanger region of Vestland county, Norway. It is one of the three glaciers that make up the large Folgefonna glacier. It is located on the border of Ullensvang and Kvinnherad municipalities between the Nordre Folgefonna and Søndre Folgefonna glaciers on the Folgefonna peninsula. In a book by glaciologist Olav Orheim from 2009 the area is listed as only . The glacier drains partly to the Maurangerfjord to the west, and partly to the Sørfjorden to the east.

See also
List of glaciers in Norway

References

Glaciers of Vestland
Ullensvang
Kvinnherad